Stephen Carter may refer to:

Stephen Carter (Louisiana politician) (1943–2021), Louisiana state representative
Stephen Carter (MP), Member of Parliament for Scarborough
Stephen Carter (architect) (born 1945), American architect
Stephen L. Carter (born 1954), American law professor and writer
Stephen Carter, Baron Carter of Barnes (born 1964), former Downing Street Chief of Staff
Stephen Carter (footballer) (born 1974), Australian rules footballer
Stephen Carter, guitarist with punk band Gallows
Stephen R. Carter (editor), editor and publications director of the Mormon periodical Sunstone

See also
Steve Carter (disambiguation)